Alan Burton may refer to:

 Alan Burton (footballer, born 1991), English footballer
 Alan Burton (footballer, born 1939), English footballer
Alan Burton (boxer) from ABA Heavyweight Champions
Alan C. Burton (1904–1979), Canadian physician